"Standing Knee Deep in a River (Dying of Thirst)" is a song written by Bob McDill, Dickey Lee and Bucky Jones, and recorded by American country music artist Kathy Mattea.  It was released in January 1993 as the second single from the album Lonesome Standard Time.  The song reached number 19 on the Billboard Hot Country Singles & Tracks chart.

Joe Cocker covered the song on his 1994 album Have a Little Faith, as did Don Williams on his 1992 album Currents.

Chart performance

References

1993 singles
1992 songs
Kathy Mattea songs
Joe Cocker songs
Don Williams songs
Songs written by Bucky Jones
Songs written by Dickey Lee
Songs written by Bob McDill
Mercury Records singles
Song recordings produced by Brent Maher